Azerbaijani wine is produced in several regions throughout Azerbaijan. Prior to 20th century communist rule, the region which makes up modern-day Azerbaijan had a thriving wine industry that dated back to the second millennium BC. Azerbaijan's long history of wine production was rediscovered at archaeological digs of settlements in Kültəpə, Qarabağlar and Galajig where archaeologists discovered stone fermentation and storage vessels that included residue and grape seeds dating back to the second millennium BC. The Ancient Greeks were well aware of wine production in the area by at least the 7th century BC according to Herodotus. Later Strabo would comment in the 1st century BC about a wine known as Albania from the region. Arabic historians and geographers—most notably Abu'l-Fida, Al-Masudi, Ibn Hawqal and Al-Muqaddasi - described the extensive viticulture around Ganja and Barda that was taking place even after Islamic conquest of the area.

Since the fall of Communism and the restoration of Azerbaijani independence, ardent attempts have been made to revive and modernize the Azerbaijani wine industry. Today vineyards are found in the foothills of Caucasus Mountains as well and the Kur-Araz lowlands near the Kura River. In the 21st century, Ganja, Nakhchivan, and the separatist region of Nagorno-Karabakh controlled by the self-proclaimed Republic of Artsakh have emerged as centers of wine production in the region. Among the grape varieties used to produce Azerbaijani wine include Pinot noir, Rkatsiteli, Pinot blanc, Aligote, Matrassa, Podarok Magaracha, Pervenets Magaracha, Ranni Magaracha, Doina, Viorica and Kishmish Moldavski. Local grape varieties indigenous to Azerbaijan include White Shani, Derbendi, Nail, Bayanshire, Gamashara, Ganja Pink, Bendi, Madrasa, Black Shani, Arna-Grna, Zeynabi, Misgali, Khindogni, Agdam Kechiemdzhei, Tebrizi, and Marandi.

History
In Goygol Rayon of the country, archeologists have found jars with remains of wines which date back to the second millennium BC.

In the Khanlar district of Azerbaijan, for example, archeologists have found jars buried with the remains of wine dating back to the 2nd millennium BC. Greek historian Strabo who had traveled to what nowadays comprises the Republic of Azerbaijan (Caucasian Albania at the time) described cultivation of crops of grapes as so abundant that the residents were not able to harvest them. Other sources such as the epic poem Kitabi Dada Gorgud written in 7th-11th centuries describe enriched culture of wine-making. The wines produced in ancient and medieval ages, however, are not similar to contemporary wines. They were thick and sweet as honey which people had to dilute with water. One of the latest discoveries was nearly 10 years ago when the residents of Shamakhy, two hours west of Baku, found a big ancient ceramic jar containing thick syrup which turned out to be a very concentrated fragrant wine.

One of the most ancient and notable regions known for its wine-making produce is Tovuz in northwestern Azerbaijan. Archeological findings in this region speak of ancient vessels for wine storage, stones and remains of tartaric acid used for wine-growing. In addition to historians and travellers such as Homer, Herodotus, Columella, Ibn Hawqal, Al-Masudi, who made remarks about wine-making in what nowadays comprises Azerbaijan, the Arabian geographer of the 10th century Al-Muqaddasi, noted in his writing that the sweet kind of wine found in Nakhichevan cannot be found anywhere else. The region developed as wine producing center from 1820-1830s attracting many foreign investors. The famous culture of wine-making was enriched with arrival of German immigrants to the region in the early 19th century. German immigrants from Württemberg were settled in Azerbaijan by the Russian tsar Alexander I circa 1817-1818 and enhanced the wine and cognac producing potential of the country by heavy investments into the industry. Famous German family businesses such as Vohrer Brothers and the Hummel family based in Helenendorf industrialized the wine production making it competitive with European wines.

Modern times
The contemporary wine-making in Azerbaijan is seen in Ganja-Qazakh and Shirvan economic zones. Vineyards in these regions account to about 7% of the country's cultivated land. The regions are famous for 17 vine and 16 table grape varieties, the most common of the wine cultivars being Pinot Noir.

Azerbaijan is one of the main wine producers in the Caspian Sea region. Contemporary wine-making was ambitiously developed during the 1970s by Soviet authorities who preferred to increase the wine production versus development of the grain industry. As per special decrees of the Cabinet of Ministers, more funds were allocated for the industry setting between 70 and 80 thousand hectares of land for vineyards. The initial plans were to produce as much as 3 million tons of grapes annually by 1990. Due to increased productivity, Azerbaijan was producing nearly 2.1 million tons of grapes by 1982. The industry brought about 100 million rubles annually. Most of wines produced in Azerbaijan during Soviet rule were exported to Russia, Belarus, and the Baltic, however, during the 1980s export was slowed due to Gorbachev's alcoholism prohibition campaign.

Currently, there are nearly 10 wineries and vineyards producing wine in the country. The largest one is Vinagro, created in 2006. It uses the Goygol Wine Plant near Ganja founded in 1860 by German immigrants. Exports to other countries are steadily growing due to good quality of Azerbaijani wine products. Most of produce is currently being targeted for Russian and European markets as well as new growing markets for Azerbaijani wine such as China. Due to growing demand, new grape plantations have been set up over 100 hectares in Shamkir region of Azerbaijan. Since restoration of independence of Azerbaijan in 1991, the Azerbaijani wines won 27 prizes at international competitions. 
Azerbaijan has been increasing its wine production for the last several years. In 2003, it produced 3,790, in 2005 - 4,005 and in 2007 - 7,200 tons of wine.
Moreover, Azerbaijan is one of the main wine producers in the territory of the Caspian Sea. Despite vodka was considered as a part of “drinking culture” during the USSR, Azerbaijani wine was one of the favorites in Russia even before the Gorbachev purge.
According to the prohibition law by the Soviet Union in 1985 on vine production totally prevented a growing industry in Azerbaijan. Before this law, the production of grapes was equal to two tons per year, which meant provision of 40-45% of Azerbaijan's SSR GDP.
Azerbaijan is aimed to gain more reputation in the world's vine market. It is a result of joining the International Organization of Vine and Wine (OIV).

In 2012, Azerbaijani president approved a decree "State Program for development of grape growth 2012-2020". The aim of the program is to increase the grape growth as well as develop winemaking, and rise the rate of exportation. Each year, the size of the territories for growing grape is rising. Within the state program, territory of grape gardens will be 50 thousand hectares. It is expected that the grape growth will reach to 500 tons until 2020. 30% of grape is considered to be consumed for eating. The rest of the crop will be used to produce various brands of wine. In Azerbaijan, specialists in this area co-operates with the International Organisation of Vine and Wine (IOVW), National Institute for Vine and Wine “Magarach”, Yalta, Tairov Wine Making and Wine Growing Institute, Odessa and other organizations.

Climate and geography

 
The mountainous geography of Azerbaijan and its close location to the large Caspian Sea creates a vast diversity of macro and microclimates that depend on exact location as well as altitude, latitude and orientation and degree of slopes. While generally considered a continental climate, wine regions in Azerbaijani can see anything from moderately warm growing seasons with dry winters to very cool growing seasons with rainy, wet harvests and winter seasons with nearly 10% of Azerbaijani vineyards needing to utilizing some form of winter protection. Nearly half of all Azerbaijani vineyards need to utilize some form of irrigation to help deal with periodic droughts during the warm summer months.

The average annual temperatures for many Azerbaijani wine regions fall between 10.5 and 15.5 °C (51-60 °F). Azerbaijan includes Regions III, IV and V on the heat summation scale with areas seeing anywhere from 3,000 to 4,6000 degree days. Annual rainfall in the lowlands, where most of the grapes are grown, up to the foothills varies from 250-600mm.

Wine styles

In Azerbaijan, wines made from grapes are called  while wines from other fruits including apples, pomegranates and mulberry are called . Other sorts are called . According to historians, there are more than 450 different categories of wild grape found in Azerbaijan which had been used for wine-making throughout the history of Azerbaijan.
Among the historical names of wine brands are Reyhani, Jumhuri, Mishmish, Valani, Arastun, Handigun and Salmavey. Contemporary brand names include Shahdagh, Chinar, Sadili, Aghdam, Kurdamir, Aghstafa and Madrasali. Others, such as "Giz Galasi" (Maiden Tower), "Yeddi Gozal" (Seven Beauties), "Gara Gila" and "Naznazi" made from the Madrasa pink grape are exclusive to Azerbaijan since they are indigenous to Madrasa village of Shamakhi Rayon only. Rkatsiteli is another kind of grape grown and used for wine-making in northwestern Azerbaijan.

Effect on the Azerbaijani economy 
Wine is considered as the second most popular alcoholic beverage in Azerbaijan, which is preferred by 37 % of the drinkers according to the WHO reports. Wine consumed in Azerbaijan is both locally produced and imported from other countries. Recent years Azerbaijani wine is being produced in larger quantities, namely more than 1 million deciliters of which 375 thousand was exported.

Russia was the main export destination for Azerbaijani wine with 90% of the total amount in 2017. The other main export countries are China, Kyrgyzstan and Belgium.

See also
Beer in Azerbaijan
Azerbaijani cuisine
Winemaking

References

External links
History of Vine growing and wine making
Wine and Wagons. Helenendorf: Azerbaijan's First German Settlement, on German wine-growing community of Azerbaijan, by Azerbaijan International

 
Azerbaijani alcoholic drinks
Wine by country
Azerbaijani cuisine